Zorile may refer to several villages in Romania:

 Zorile, a village in Copăcele Commune, Caraș-Severin County
 Zorile, a village in Adamclisi Commune, Constanța County
 Zorile, a village in Grădinari Commune, Giurgiu County

and a commune in Moldova:
 Zorile, Orhei, a commune in Orhei District